Itești is a commune in Bacău County, Western Moldavia, Romania. It is composed of four villages: Ciumași, Dumbrava, Făgețel and Itești. These were part of Berești-Bistrița Commune until 2005, when they were split off.

Natives
 Constantin Avram

References

Communes in Bacău County
Localities in Western Moldavia